Michael Terry may refer to:
 Michael Terry (explorer), Australian explorer and writer
 Michael Grant Terry, American actor
 Michael Terry (serial killer), American serial killer
 Michael Terry (athlete), Antigua and Barbuda middle-distance runner

See also
 Michael Tarry, Canadian singer